Mohammed Sani Musa CON (born 11 May 1965) is a Nigerian politician and the senator representing the Niger East Senatorial District of Niger State at the Nigerian 9th National Assembly.

Biography

Mohammed Sani Musa was born in the northern part of Nigeria on June 11, 1965, in Minna, Niger State, Nigeria.

The social media bill controversy

On November 5, 2019, the Nigerian Senate re-introduced a bill that sought to regulate the use of social media in the country, leading to public outrage. The bill, "Protection from Internet Falsehood and Manipulations Bill 2019" was one of the 11 bills read for the first time at the floor of the house that day. Musa sponsored the proposed legislation.

Sponsorship of the bill

Musa said, in regards to individuals who post false information on the internet, that the "penalty for defaulters goes up to N300,000 for individuals and up to N10 million for corporate organisations and imprisonment of up to three years or both." Musa also lamented that troll or bot accounts have been used to rapidly spread falsehood across Nigeria in a manner that now threatens national security. He said, "one of the disadvantages of the internet is the spread of falsehood and manipulation of unsuspecting users. Today, motivated by geopolitical interest and identity politics, state and non-state actors use the internet to discredit government, misinform people and turn one group against the other." He added, "The hoax about the demise of President Muhammadu Buhari in London and his purported replacement by one Jubril of Sudan, among others, are things that threaten the peace, security and harmony of our people."

Award 
In October 2022, a Nigerian national honour of Commander Of The Order Of The Niger (CON) was conferred on him by President Muhammadu Buhari.

Political career
On February 7, 2019, the Federal High Court, Abuja, declared Mohammed Musa, as the Niger East Senatorial district candidate for the All Progressives Congress (APC) candidate in the February 23, 2019 election, agreeing that Musa was the declared winner of the primary election the APC conducted in the senatorial district on October 2, 2018.

In the February 23, 2019, Niger East Senatorial district election, Musa won with 229,415 votes ahead of the candidate of the Peoples Democratic Party (PDP), Ibrahim Ishaku, who got 116,143 votes.

On June 14, 2019, the Nigerian Supreme Court in Abuja declared Mohammed Sani Musa the winner of the last Senate election held in the Niger-East Senatorial District of Niger State, the court set aside the judgment of the Court of Appeal, Abuja, the valid candidate of the APC, that won the election.

References

1965 births
Living people
All Progressives Congress politicians
People from Minna
Ahmadu Bello University alumni